Hitcham is the name of more than one place in the United Kingdom:

Hitcham, Buckinghamshire
Hitcham, Suffolk, near Ipswich